SFD may stand for:

 Sacramento Fire Department, Sacramento, California
 Salford Central railway station, Greater Manchester, England (National Rail station code)
 Seattle Fire Department, Seattle, Washington
 Software Freedom Day
 Start frame delimiter of an Ethernet frame
 Schwarze Filmschaffende in Deutschland, a professional association based in Berlin, Germany
 NYSE indicator of Smithfield Foods
 Snake fungal disease
 Spline Font Database, a FontForge font file format
 Shit flow diagram